Aulie is a surname. Notable people with the name include:

 Andreas Aulie (1897–1990), Norwegian jurist
 Keith Aulie (born 1989), Canadian ice hockey defenceman
 Marianne Aulie (born 1971), Norwegian painter and model
 Otto Aulie (1894–1923), Norwegian football defender
 Reidar Aulie (1904–1977), Norwegian artist
 Richard P. Aulie (born 1927) American evangelical Christian essayist

Norwegian-language surnames